Sue Woolfe (born 15 November 1950) is an Australian author, teacher, scriptwriter, editor and documentary film-maker.

Biography 

Woolfe was raised in the Blue Mountains west of Sydney and completed tertiary studies at the University of Sydney and the University of New England.

Her first novel, Painted Woman, was runner-up in the ABC Bicentennial Awards. Later she adapted the novel for stage and radio.

She was awarded a D'Arts from UTS in 2006.

Bibliography

  
  
  
   Also published in France, 2009 
  
  
  
  Republished 2009 by University of Western Australia Press.

Awards and nominations

 1996 - New South Wales Premier's Literary Awards, Christina Stead Prize for fiction for Leaning Towards Infinity. Short-listed for almost every major Australian prize, short-listed for US TipTree Prize, and for the Commonwealth Prize, the winner in the Pacific- Asia region, and listed among the top for novels for final prize.

Many grants from the Literature Board of the Australia Council, from 1994 to 2015.

Scholarly life:
Lecture in Creative Writing, the Department of English, the University of Sydney 2004- 2013.  Lecturer in Creativity and Narration at the National Institute of Dramatic Art (NIDA), Sydney, 2014–2017.

External links 
AustLit Agent - Sue Woolfe's profile on AustLit.
Sue Woolfe on writing dangerously - Article on Woolfe by Anna North.
The Secret Cure - A review in The Age newspaper.
 - Sue Woolfe's official personal website

1950 births
Australian non-fiction writers
Living people
Writers from New South Wales
Australian women novelists
International Writing Program alumni